Guglielmo Guerrini (Bagnacavallo, 24 May 1950) is an Italian sport coach, since 1989 is the trainer of the canoeing champion, Josefa Idem.

Biography
In 1990 he married the German canoeist Josefa Idem, whom he trained since 1989. The couple has two sons, Janek and Jonas.

Under his guidance Idem has won five world championship gold medals and three olympic medals. Guerrini studies and applies innovative methodology, is federal technical consultant for canoeing and, in 2009, was nominated responsible for the preparation in the discipline for the Olympic games 2012 in London. He thus guides Idem to her 8th Olympics.

See also
Josefa Idem

References

External links
Josefa Idem-Guerrini biography from site Sports-reference

1950 births
Living people
Italian sports coaches
Sportspeople from the Province of Ravenna